Manuel Faißt (born 11 January 1993) is a German nordic combined athlete.

Career
Germany's Manuel Faißt has relations to other people who are nordic combined athletes. In Faißt's case, his father has been a Nordic Combined athlete himself and worked as a coach at Faißt's home club of Baiersbronn. 4-year-old Manuel skied down the outrun of the 10-metre hill at Bergergrund and at age 5, he had already made his first jumps. Soon, Faißt's ambitious personality paid off, and he started collecting medals and trophies from competitions that he won, even in his younger years. In 2009, Faißt won the European Youth Olympic Festival in Szczyrk and the OPA Games at his home venue in Baiersbronn, as well as making his debut in the World Cup at Lillehammer. He achieved his first World Cup Top Ten result in 2011 at Ramsau am Dachstein with a career-best seventh rank.

In his most successful season so far (2012/13), Faißt dominated the Junior World Championships at Liberec, walking away with all possible gold medals in the two individual and one team event as well as getting started at university in Freiburg where Faißt studied law.

Personal life
Faißt's hobbies include biking, cooking, and football.

Olympic Games results

World Championship results

References

External links

1993 births
German male Nordic combined skiers
Living people
People from Furtwangen im Schwarzwald
Sportspeople from Freiburg (region)
Nordic combined skiers at the 2022 Winter Olympics
Olympic Nordic combined skiers of Germany
Olympic silver medalists for Germany
Olympic medalists in Nordic combined
Medalists at the 2022 Winter Olympics
21st-century German people